Nikitskaya is a rural locality (a village) in Aleshkovskoye Rural Settlement, Ternovsky District, Voronezh Oblast, Russia. The population was 384 as of 2010. There are 7 streets.

Geography 
Nikitskaya is located 16 km east of Ternovka (the district's administrative centre) by road. Aleshki is the nearest rural locality.

References 

Rural localities in Ternovsky District